Petersburg Courthouse is a historic courthouse building located at Petersburg, Virginia. It was designed by New York architect Calvin Pollard and built between 1838 and 1840.  It is a two-story, Classical Revival style brick building.  It rests on a granite foundation and measures 57 feet wide and 93 feet deep.  It features a pedimented hexastyle front portico and a double-tiered bell and clock tower modeled after the Choragic Monument of Lysicrates in Athens. Major work was performed on the structure until 1877 when extensive repairs and interior alterations were carried out. A 30-foot addition was constructed in 1965.  During the Siege of Petersburg, Union troops used the tower for a sighting mark and spared the structure from the bombardment.

It was listed on the National Register of Historic Places in 1973.  It is located in the Petersburg Courthouse Historic District.

References

External links

Hustings Courthouse, Courthouse Avenue & North Sycamore Street, Petersburg, Petersburg, VA: 6 photos and 13 data pages at Historic American Buildings Survey

Historic American Buildings Survey in Virginia
Courthouses on the National Register of Historic Places in Virginia
County courthouses in Virginia
Neoclassical architecture in Virginia
Government buildings completed in 1840
Buildings and structures in Petersburg, Virginia
National Register of Historic Places in Petersburg, Virginia
Individually listed contributing properties to historic districts on the National Register in Virginia